Robert Friedrich Joachim (13 January 1987 – 25 November 2020) was a German male weightlifter, competing in the 69 kg category and representing Germany at international competitions.

He competed at the World Weightlifting Championships in 2013, 2015, 2017, and 2018.

In the 69 kg class at the European Weightlifting Championships, Joachim competed in 2016, won all-around bronze in 2017 (with silver in clean and jerk) and all-around silver in 2018 (with bronze in clean and jerk).

Major results

References

External links
 

1987 births
2020 deaths
German male weightlifters
Place of birth missing
European Weightlifting Championships medalists